Eddie Gallagher (born 21 November 1964 in Glasgow) is a Scottish retired professional football striker. He played in his homeland for Partick Thistle, Hamilton Academical, Dunfermline Athletic, Dundee and St Mirren before a spell in Hong Kong at Instant-Dict.

External links 

1964 births
Living people
Footballers from Glasgow
Scottish footballers
Scottish Football League players
Partick Thistle F.C. players
Hamilton Academical F.C. players
Dunfermline Athletic F.C. players
Dundee F.C. players
Scottish expatriate sportspeople in Hong Kong
St Mirren F.C. players
Scottish expatriate footballers
Expatriate footballers in Hong Kong
Expatriate football managers in Ghana
Association football forwards
Scottish football managers